In Transit is a live album by Canadian progressive rock band Saga. The album was recorded at the Rudi-Sedlmayer-Halle in Munich on February 5, 1982 and at the Tivoli Concert Hall in Copenhagen on February 22, 23, and 24, 1982. The album went platinum in Canada, selling 100,000 copies and gold in Germany, selling 250,000 copies. The album reached #10 in Canada and was #58 in the Canadian year end chart.

Track listing

Notes
At the end of the album, the toll of chiming bells at Copenhagen Town Hall can be heard
The 2003 re-release contains a screensaver

Personnel
 Michael Sadler - lead vocals, except on "No Regrets (Chapter Five)", keyboards, bass guitar, electronic drum pads on "A Brief Case"
 Ian Crichton - guitars
 Jim Crichton - bass guitar, keyboards
 Jim Gilmour - lead keyboards, backing and lead vocals on "No Regrets (Chapter Five)", clarinet
 Steve Negus - drums and electronic percussion

Production
 Produced by Jim Crichton
 Sound Engineering - Gerd Rautenbach
 Assistant Mixing Engineering by Andi Charal
 Technician - Mike Kahsnitz, assisted by Detlef Wiederhoeft
 Mixed at Phase One and Manta Sound Studios, Toronto
 Engineering - Mark Wright, assisted by Robin Brouwer and Lenny DeRose (Phase One) and Ron Searles (Manta)
 Art Direction by Zoran Busic
 Cover design and graphics by Hugh Syme
 Photography by Deborah Samuel

Charts

Weekly charts

Year-end charts

Certifications and sales

References

Saga (band) albums
1982 live albums